Parent is an unincorporated community in St. George Township, Benton County, Minnesota, United States, near Foley.  The community is located along State Highway 23 (MN 23) near 85th Avenue NE.

Parent was named for Auguste Parent, an early settler of French descent.

References

Unincorporated communities in Benton County, Minnesota
Unincorporated communities in Minnesota